Anaerococcus lactolyticus is a bacterium from the family Peptoniphilaceae. A. lactolyticus along A. vaginalis can be a dominant species in Diabetic foot and pressure ulcers. It can also participate in polymicrobial infections of the urinary tract.

References 

Bacteria described in 1992
Peptoniphilaceae